Bass Point  is a headland in Australia on the New South Wales south coast.

The point was named by Matthew Flinders in around 1800, after his friend and fellow explorer George Bass.

The waters just off the point are considered a critical habitat for the endangered grey nurse shark, so fishing there is restricted.

Bass Point is also home to renowned big wave surfing spot "Redsands", which breaks off a headland at the entrance to Bass Point Reserve.

See also 

 Bass Point Reserve

References

External links 
Wikiscuba (Shellharbour Diving)

Headlands of New South Wales
Wollongong
Surfing locations in New South Wales